William Edmondson (1874–1951) was an African-American sculptor.

William Edmondson may also refer to:
William Edmondson (footballer) (played 1902-03), English footballer
William Edmundson (1627–1712), or Edmondson, English founder of Quakerism in Ireland
William B. Edmondson (1927–2013), American army officer
William Edmondson (sound engineer) (1906–1998), American sound engineer